Cathy Stewart (2 April 1956 – 9 August 1994) was a French pornographic actress who appeared in the majority of France's hardcore films between 1976 and the early eighties. She also appeared in several non-pornographic pictures, most notably Jean Rollin's 1980 horror film La Nuit des Traquées where she was credited under her real name.

Suffering from drug addiction, she stopped her career in the 1980s, and died from an overdose.

References

External links
 
 
 
 

1956 births
1994 deaths
French pornographic film actresses
20th-century French actresses
People from Royan
Drug-related deaths in France
Sex workers drug-related deaths